TruChoice Federal Credit Union (TRUFCU) is a credit union based in Portland, Maine, United States. It serves members in York and Cumberland counties. Founded on January 12, 1955 as Maine Medical Center Credit Union, it had 12,066 members and approximately $119.37 million in assets as of June 2017. 

On July 31, 2017, the credit union opened a branch in Biddeford, Maine.

In August 2017, TRUFCU was named one of the best places to work in Maine by the Maine State Council of the Society for Human Resources Management.

External links
 US Credit Unions report

References

Banks established in 1955
1955 establishments in Maine
Credit unions based in Maine
Companies based in Portland, Maine